"Old Me" is a song by Australian pop rock band 5 Seconds of Summer, released on 21 February 2020 originally as the first promotional single from the band's fourth studio album Calm, before being released to radio on 6 March 2020 as the album's fourth single. The song was written by Luke Hemmings, Ashton Irwin, Alexandra Tamposi, Andrew Wotman, William Walsh, Louis Bell, Brian Lee and Andre Proctor.

Background
In a statement, Hemmings said "'Old Me' carries a youthful spirit and follows the narrative of a young person's life growing up, for better or for worse. Every decision we made, whether right or wrong, has led us to the men we are proud to be today. We were thrown into the public eye at a young age and gratefully had each other at a confusing time. Sometimes it's important we look back in order to appreciate the journey we've been on together."

Composition
Amelia Parreira of Riff magazine described the lyrics of "Old Me" as being "a shout-out to a past self and past decisions". The song begins with an underlying organ before a "plethora of percussion pumps up the beat to transform the track into a high-energy dance anthem". Parreira said the sound is a metaphor of the band leaving the past behind. Gigwises Malvika Padin had a similar notion, labelling the song "retrospective".

Music video
A music video to accompany the release of "Old Me" was first released onto YouTube on 10 March 2020. As of March 2021, it has over 26 million views.

Charts

Weekly charts

Year-end charts

Certifications

Release history

Notes

References

2020 singles
2020 songs
5 Seconds of Summer songs
Songs written by Ali Tamposi
Songs written by Andrew Watt (record producer)
Songs written by Ashton Irwin
Songs written by Brian Lee (songwriter)
Songs written by Dre Moon
Songs written by Louis Bell
Songs written by Luke Hemmings